Endless Praise: Live is a live album from Planetshakers. Planetshakers Ministries International and Integrity Music released the album on March 11, 2014.

Critical reception

Awarding the album four stars at CCM Magazine, Matt Conner states, "it’s a meaningful way to end another solid release." Andrea Hunter, giving the album four and a half stars for Worship Leader, writes, "rife with unbridled energy, seismic emotion, percolating power pop, rock and rhythms, electronic dance, and huge anthemic choruses, all deftly woven together with perfectly placed ballads, hasn't lost its sheen." Rating the album four stars by New Release Today, Sarah Fine describes, "Clever, bright and whimsical, while still remaining powerfully authentic, Endless Praise is a project not to be overlooked." Tim Holden, indicating in an eight out of ten review from Cross Rhythms, says, "this is still a good upbeat worship album that will bear more than a couple of repeat plays." Signaling in a four and a half star review for Louder Than the Music, Jono Davies states, "Planetshakers have put together another brilliant album mixing together epic dance songs with some wonderfully intimate worship moments." A staff editor at Amazon.com gave the album a relatively positive review, writing, Originating from the fastest-growing church in Australia, Planetshakers is making a name in the praise and worship world. Endless Praise, the long-awaited follow up to the groups project, Limitless."

Awards and accolades
This album was No. 19 on the Worship Leaders Top 20 Albums of 2014 list.

The song, "Made for Worship", was No. 12 on the Worship Leader'''s Top 20 Worship Songs of 2014, So Far.

The song, "Made for Worship", was No. 11 on the Worship Leaders Top 20 Songs of 2014 list.

The video of the song "Endless Praise" was nominated for Dove Award Long Form Video of The Year 2014 at the 45th Annual GMA Dove Awards.

Track listing

Chart performanceEndless Praise: Live'' debuted at #4 on the iTunes Christian and Gospel Charts.

References

2014 live albums
Planetshakers albums